Cemetery Drive may refer to:
 Cemetery Drive, Menands, New York
Cemetery Drive (My Chemical Romance song)
Cemetery Drive (hip hop group)
Cemetery Drive (band from Italy)